Delftia litopenaei is a Gram-negative, short-rod-shaped, non-spore-forming, motile bacterium from the Comamonadaceae family, which was isolated from a freshwater shrimp culture pond in Taiwan. It has the ability to accumulate poly-β-hydroxybutyrate.

References

External links
Type strain of Delftia litopenaei at BacDive -  the Bacterial Diversity Metadatabase

Comamonadaceae
Bacteria described in 2012